Hasir Al-Jar is a sub-district located in Na'man District, Al Bayda Governorate, Yemen.  Hasir Al-Jar had a population of 495 according to the 2004 census.

References 

Sub-districts in Na'man District